The Judaean Mountains, or Judaean Hills or the Hebron Mountains, is a mountain range in Palestine and Israel where Jerusalem, Hebron and several other biblical cities are located. The Judean Mountains can be separated to a number of sub-regions, including the Mount Hebron ridge, the Jerusalem ridge and the Judean slopes. 

The Judaean Mountains formed the heartland of the Kingdom of Judah (930-586 BCE), where the earliest Jewish settlements emerged, and from which Jews are generally descended.

Geography
The Judaean mountains are part of a more extended range that runs in a north-south direction. The ridge consists of the Samarian Hills in its northern part, and of the Judaean mountains in its southern part, the two segments meeting at the latitude of Ramallah. The westward descent from the hard limestone country of the Judaean mountains towards the coastal plain is by way of a longitudinal trough of fosse cut through chalk, followed by the low, rolling soft limestone hills of the Shephelah, while eastwards the landscape falls steeply towards the Jordan Rift Valley. The southern end of the mountain range is at Beersheba in the northern part of the Negev, where the mountains slope down into the Beersheba-Arad valley. The northern section of the Judaean mountains is referred to as Jerusalem Hills, and the southern one as Hebron Hills.

The Judaean Mountains were heavily forested in antiquity. The range is mostly composed of terra rossa soils over hard limestones.

Geology and palaeontology
The Judaean Mountains are the surface expression of a series of monoclinic folds which trend north-northwest through Israel. The folding is the central expression of the Syrian Arc belt of anticlinal folding that began in the Late Cretaceous Period in northeast Africa and southwest Asia. The Syrian Arc extends east-northeast across the Sinai, turns north-northeast through Israel and continues the east-northeast trend into Syria. The Israeli segment parallels the Dead Sea Transform which lies just to the east. The uplift events that created the mountain occurred in two phases one in the Late Eocene-Early Oligocene and second in the Early Miocene.

In prehistoric times, animals no longer found elsewhere in the Levant region were found here, including elephants, rhinoceroses, giraffes and wild Asian water buffalo.

The range has karst topography including a stalactite cave in Nahal Sorek National Park between Jerusalem and Beit Shemesh and the area surrounding Ofra, where fossils of prehistoric flora and fauna were found.

In the Hebrew Bible
According to the Hebrew Bible, the Judean mountains were the allotment of the Tribe of Judah and the heartland of the former Kingdom of Judah.

Transportation
The main freeway between Tel Aviv and Jerusalem, which further extends to Jordan Valley as regular road, Highway 1, passes through Judean Mountains, between Beit Shemesh and Jerusalem.

An Israel Railways line, Jaffa-Jerusalem railway runs from Beit Shemesh along the Brook of Sorek and Valley of Rephaim into Jerusalem Malha Train Station. The line has since been largely replaced by Tel Aviv-Jerusalem railway, which utilizes tunnels and bridges through Judean Mountains, runs up to 160km/h (99 mph) between Ben Gurion Airport and Jerusalem-Yitzhak Navon railway station.

Gallery

See also
 Judaean Desert, the arid area in the eastern Judaean Mountains and western Jordan Rift Valley
 Mount of Temptation (Jebel Quruntul)

References

External links

 Pictures
 Judaean Mountains & Jerusalem
 Symbolism and Landscape: The Etzion Bloc in the Judaean Mountains, Yossi Katz and John C. Lehr

Mountain ranges of Israel
Hebrew Bible mountains
Mountains of the West Bank